The geometer moths are moths belonging to the family Geometridae of the insect order Lepidoptera, the moths and butterflies. A very large family, it has around 23,000 species of moths described, and over 1400 species from six subfamilies indigenous to North America alone. A well-known member is the peppered moth, Biston betularia, which has been subject of numerous studies in population genetics. Several other geometer moths are notorious pests.

Caterpillars
The name "Geometridae" ultimately derives from Latin  from Greek  ("geometer", "earth-measurer"). This refers to the means of locomotion of the larvae or caterpillars, which lack the full complement of prolegs seen in other caterpillars, with only two or three pairs at the posterior end instead of the usual five pairs. Equipped with appendages at both ends of the body, a caterpillar clasps with its front legs and draws up the hind end, then clasps with the hind end (prolegs) and reaches out for a new front attachment - creating the impression that it measures its journey. The caterpillars are accordingly called "loopers", "spanworms", or "inchworms" after their characteristic looping gait. The cabbage looper and soybean looper are not inchworms, but caterpillars of a different family. They tend to be green, grey, or brownish and hide from predators by fading into the background or resembling twigs. Many inchworms, when disturbed, stand erect and motionless on their prolegs, increasing the resemblance. Some have humps or filaments, or cover themselves in plant material. They are gregarious and are generally smooth. Some eat lichen, flowers, or pollen, while some, such as the Hawaiian species of the genus Eupithecia, are carnivorous. Certain destructive inchworms are called cankerworms.

In 2019, the first geometrid caterpillar in Baltic amber was discovered by German scientists. It was described as the earliest evidence for the subfamily of Ennominae, particularly the tribe of Boarmiini.

Adults
Many geometrids have slender abdomens and broad wings which are usually held flat with the hindwings visible. As such, they appear rather butterfly-like, but in most respects they are typical moths; the majority fly at night, they possess a frenulum to link the wings, and the antennae of the males are often feathered. They tend to blend into the background, often with intricate, wavy patterns on their wings. In some species, females have reduced wings (e.g. winter moth and fall cankerworm). They have distinctive paired tympanal organs at the base of the abdomen (lacking in flightless females).

Systematics

The placement of the example species follows a 1990 systematic treatment; it may be outdated. Subfamilies are tentatively sorted in a phylogenetic sequence, from the most basal to the most advanced. Traditionally, the Archiearinae were held to be the most ancient of the geometer moth lineages, as their caterpillars have well-developed prolegs. However, it now seems that the Larentiinae are actually older, as indicated by their numerous plesiomorphies and DNA sequence data. They are either an extremely basal lineage of the Geometridae – together with the Sterrhinae –, or might even be considered a separate family of Geometroidea. As regards the Archiearinae, some species that were traditionally placed therein actually seem to belong to other subfamilies; altogether it seems that in a few cases, the prolegs which were originally lost in the ancestral geometer moths re-evolved as an atavism.

Larentiinae – about 5,800 species, includes the pug moths, mostly temperate, might be a distinct family

Sterrhinae – about 2,800 species, mostly tropical, might belong to same family as the Larentiinae
 Birch mocha, Cyclophora albipunctata
 False mocha, Cyclophora porata
 Maiden's blush, Cyclophora punctaria
 Riband wave, Idaea aversata
 Small fan-footed wave, Idaea biselata
 Single-dotted wave, Idaea dimidiata
 Small scallop, Idaea emarginata
 Idaea filicata
 Dwarf cream wave, Idaea fuscovenosa
 Rusty wave, Idaea inquinata
 Purple-bordered gold, Idaea muricata
 Bright wave, Idaea ochrata
 Least carpet, Idaea rusticata
 Small dusty wave, Idaea seriata
 Purple-barred yellow, Lythria cruentaria (formerly in Larentiinae)
 Vestal, Rhodometra sacraria
 Common pink-barred, Rhodostrophia vibicaria
 Middle lace border, Scopula decorata
 Cream wave, Scopula floslactata
 Small blood-vein, Scopula imitaria
 Lewes wave, Scopula immorata
 Lesser cream wave, Scopula immutata
 Mullein wave, Scopula marginepunctata
 Zachera moth, Chiasmia defixaria
 Blood-vein, Timandra comae
 Eastern blood-vein, Timandra griseata

Desmobathrinae – pantropical

Geometrinae – emerald moths, about 2,300 named species, most tropical

Archiearinae – 12 species; holarctic, southern Andes and Tasmania, though the latter some seem to belong to the Ennominae, larvae have all the prolegs except most are reduced.
 Infant, Archiearis infans (Möschler, 1862)
 Scarce infant, Leucobrephos brephoides (Walker, 1857)

Oenochrominae – in some treatments used as a "wastebin taxon" for genera that are difficult to place in other groups

Alsophilinae – a few genera, defoliators of trees, might belong in the Ennominae, tribe Boarmiini
 March moth, Alsophila aescularia
 Fall cankerworm, Alsophila pometaria

Ennominae – about 9,700 species, including some defoliating pests, global distribution
 †Eogeometer vadens

Geometridae genera incertae sedis include:
 Dichromodes
 Homoeoctenia
 Nearcha

Fossil Geometridae taxa include:
 †Eogeometer Fischer, Michalski & Hausmann, 2019
 †Hydriomena? protrita Cockerell, 1922 (Priabonian, Florissant Formation, Colorado)
 †Geometridites Clark et al., 1971

References

Further reading

External links
 "Family Geometridae" at Insecta.pro
 Anacamptodes pergracilis, cypress looper on the University of Florida / Institute of Food and Agricultural Sciences Featured Creatures website
 Geometridae species in New Zealand  
 Geometridae species in Portugal

 
Taxa named by William Elford Leach
Eocene insects
Extant Eocene first appearances
Priabonian first appearances